Drillia griffithii is a species of sea snail, a marine gastropod mollusk in the family Drilliidae.

Description

Distribution
This species occurs in the Indian Ocean off Madagascar.

References

 Dautzenberg, Ph. (1929). Mollusques testaces marins de Madagascar. Faune des Colonies Francaises, Tome III
  Tucker, J.K. 2004 Catalog of recent and fossil turrids (Mollusca: Gastropoda). Zootaxa 682:1–1295

External links

griffithii
Gastropods described in 1843